Imaginary Friends is the fourth studio album by Freezepop, released on December 7, 2010.

History
Imaginary Friends is the first Freezepop album to be released since the departure of The Duke of Pannekoeken and addition of Robert John "Bananas" Foster and Christmas Disco-Marie Sagan.

The album went on pre-sale on November 26, 2010. People who preordered Imaginary Friends received an "Instant Gratification Pack." This pack included five tracks: two songs from Imaginary Friends, a remix of both those songs and a B-side. Additionally, the band posted the song "Magnetic" on their website for free. Shortly before the presale went active, the song was pulled and replaced with "Doppelgänger." "Magnetic" then became one of the two songs available in the Instant Gratification Pack.

1000 copies of the album were released as a limited edition double CD with autographs from the band and an extra disc called "Secret Companion."

The songs "Doppelgänger" and "Special Effects" were released on the Rock Band Network, with "Doppelgänger" later being made DLC for Rock Band 4.

Track listing

Instant Gratification Pack

Secret Companion

2010 albums
Freezepop albums